Ramona is a census-designated place (CDP) in San Diego County, California.  The population was 20,292 at the 2010 census.

The name Ramona also refers to an unincorporated community (with some plans to incorporate) that includes both the Ramona CDP and the adjacent CDP of San Diego Country Estates. The population of the two CDPs, which does not include the fringe areas surrounding the CDPs, was 30,301 at the 2010 census, up from 25,223 at the 2000 census. The Ramona Community Planning Area had a population of 33,404 at the 2000 census. The January 1, 2006, population of the Ramona Community Planning Area is estimated to be 36,405 by the San Diego Association of Governments (SANDAG). USDA Hardiness Zones are 9b and 10a.

History

Early times
Before it was permanently settled, the Ramona area was inhabited by the Kumeyaay Nation of Native Americans (Diegueño), a semi-nomadic people, who established annual settlements there as they moved between coastal and inland grounds.  Their presence is indicated by archeological evidence such as rock paintings, etchings, and grinding stones used to grind acorns into meal for bread.

During Mexican governance of California, Rancho Valle de Pamo (also called Rancho Santa María) was a  Mexican land grant that occupied the Santa Maria Valley and was centered on present-day Ramona.

The first post office was called Nuevo. The town took the name Ramona in 1886, when a land speculation syndicate, headed by Milton Santee, "organized the Santa Maria Land & Water Company and acquired  for a townsite in the Santa Maria Valley and named it Ramona". The next year the town reverted to Nuevo because there was another town, in Los Angeles County, called Ramona. However, the other town did not flourish, and when it was finally abandoned the present-day Ramona took that name. Today in Ramona, there stands a Mexican restaurant named "Nuevo Grill" in remembrance of the town's original name. The restaurant even features a few old pictures that date back to when the town was still called Nuevo.

In 1886, Theophile Verlaque built the town's first house next to Amos' store. The Verlaque house, located at 645 Main Street in Ramona, is now home to the Ramona Pioneer Historical Society and its Guy B. Woodward Museum, and in 1991 was listed on the National Register of Historic Places.

The Santa Maria Land & Water Company called its project "Ramona". When the name of the town changed from Nuevo to Ramona is subject to dispute. In The Glory Years, by Frank F. Pourade (1964, Copley Press, republished by the San Diego Historical Society), the author indicates that the Santa Maria Land & Water Company syndicate changed the name in 1886. However, the San Diego City and County Directory for 1886–87 lists the town as Nuevo. And the Ramona Town Hall website says this concerning the dedication of the building:

It was donated to the townspeople of Nuevo, on Washington's Birthday, February 22, 1894, by Augustus and Martha Barnett.  Later that year, at the insistence of Milton Santee, the town was renamed Ramona, to capitalize on the popularity of the fictional character from the best seller by Helen Hunt Jackson.

Concerned about the plight of Native Americans in southern California and elsewhere, and inspired by her friend Harriet Beecher Stowe's novel Uncle Tom's Cabin, Helen Hunt Jackson's novel Ramona was published in November 1884. It was an instant success.

The Ramona Town Hall was listed on the National Register of Historic Places in 1994.  It has also been known as Town Hall of Nuevo, and Barnett Hall.  The Hall was built on two lots donated by Milton Santee, who as noted above headed up the Santa Maria Land & Water Company syndicate.  Augustus and Martha Barnett donated the $17,000 "to the towns people of Nuevo, on Washington's Birthday, February 22, 1894."  Ramona Town Hall was designed by architect William S. Hebbard, who later, with his partner, Irving Gill, produced San Diego's best architecture until its breakup in 1907. The building is one of the largest, and oldest, adobe structures in southern California.  Photographs of William Hebbard and Ramona Town Hall may be viewed on this San Diego Historical Society page, and on the Ramona Town Hall website.

As noted in a Ramona Home Journal article:

In the past, the Town Hall was home to Ramona’s first high school. Classes met upstairs from 1894 to 1898. The town’s first bank and first library also started in the building, and several religious groups met there before their churches were built.

Other organizations that met in the Town Hall included Ramona Grange, Santa Maria Masonic Lodge, Ramona Pioneer Historical Society, Ramona Chamber of Commerce, Ramona Art Guild, Town Hall Players and Ramona Council of Arts, Unlimited.

The Town Hall was used as a theater in the 1940s, with Harry Miles running the movie projector. It also was known as the community dance hall and the site of costume balls.

Recent history
In the 1960s, boxer Archie Moore held a training camp called "Salt Mine" which trained George Foreman and Muhammad Ali. Moore fought from 1936 until 1963 and battled the top names in boxing at the time, including Rocky Marciano, Floyd Patterson and Muhammad Ali. He won 185 of his 219 bouts before retiring at 49 years old after losing to Ali. Moore's connection to San Diego was his retreat, the Salt Mine Training Camp in Ramona. He called it “Salt Mine” because he said he worked as hard there to get ready for fights as anyone did in a salt mine. The property, at the foot of Mt. Woodson, included  with five homes, a boxing ring, a sweatbox (steam room) and miles of winding country roads and trails that Moore used for road work. Moore often encountered rattlesnakes and even mountain lions on his runs.

On Mother's Day, May 13, 1973, Ramona entered the national spotlight. 55-year-old former-tennis-great-turned-hustler, Bobby Riggs, challenged the then 30-year-old women's world number-one player, Margaret Court, to a match. The match was staged at Ramona's San Diego Country Estates. Riggs won easily, 6–2, 6–1. He later lost to Billie Jean King in The Battle of the Sexes at the Astrodome in Houston, Texas, on September 20, 1973.

The Cedar Fire was the largest fire in California history at the time. In her book, A Canyon Trilogy, author Chi Varnado, a longtime Ramona resident, described many of the hardships the victims faced in the aftermath of the fire.

The Witch Fire began near Ramona near the area called Witch Creek on October 21, 2007. Roads into the town were closed. On October 24 the Witch Fire merged with another fire called the Poomacha which had originated in the area of the La Jolla Indian Reservation. Along with more than 10 other fires burning in San Diego County at the same time, the Witch-Poomacha fire helped cause the largest mandatory evacuations in U.S. history, with over 500,000 people displaced as of October 24.

In January 2006, Ramona Valley was designated the country's 162nd American Viticultural Area (AVA) by the Alcohol and Tobacco Tax and Trade Bureau, which recognized the area for its distinctive microclimate, elevation, and soil attributes.

In May 2009, a grade 6 student at Mt. Woodson Elementary, Natalie Jones, was forbidden from delivering a class presentation on assassinated gay San Francisco city councillor  Harvey Milk because her principal, and later the school district, declared it a "sensitive" issue that not all parents might want their children to learn about. The American Civil Liberties Union labeled the school district's actions as censorship and stepped in to give the school district five days to reverse its decision, and promise never to do anything like it again, or they would launch a lawsuit on Natalie's behalf. The school district did not immediately respond.

Government

Local
As an unincorporated town, Ramona's plenary local governing body is the San Diego County Board of Supervisors. However, many governmental functions operate at the local level in Ramona.

The Ramona Municipal Water District (RMWD) is Ramona's local agency (within its boundaries) for water and sewer service, fire protection, paramedic services, and parks. The RMWD contracts with the California Department of Forestry and Fire Protection to operate the Ramona Fire Department. The RMWD is governed by a five-member elected board of directors.

In the area of Ramona outside and east of the Ramona Municipal Water District, fire protection and paramedic service is provided by the InterMountain Fire - Rescue Department. It operates as a California 501c(3) non-profit corporation, and up to 9 people sit on its board of directors.  Portions of Ramona, notably the Barona Mesa area adjacent to San Diego Country Estates, are under the jurisdiction of the San Diego Rural Fire Protection District (View its District map).

With one exception, public schools in Ramona are operated by the Ramona Unified School District, which is governed by an elected five-person board of trustees. The exception was Sun Valley Charter High School. Although its charter was approved by the RUSD, it was governed by its own board. The charter school failed after a few years from a decline in the number of students and political friction from the RUSD.

Ramona Adult School was established in 1993 by the Ramona Unified School District. Ramona Adult School is a provider of adult education services in Ramona, California and serves the communities of Ballena, Santa Ysabel, San Diego Country Estates, Four Corners, Barona Reservation, Fernbrook, San Pasqual Valley, and Wynola. At an elevation of 1,430 ft, the adult school campus is located on the grounds of Montecito high school which is nestled in beautiful and historic foothills of the noteworthy Cuyamaca Mountains. Ramona Adult School offers adult education courses for adults in the areas of: high school diploma, GED, HISET, and adult basic education. Ramona Adult School works collaboratively with Palomar College and other local adult schools to connect students with post-secondary education and training. Ramona Adult School is a member of the Education to Career Network of North San Diego County. ETCN is one of 71 Consortiums in the State of California and is funded by the California Adult Education Program.

The Nuevo Gardens Memorial Cemetery is a public cemetery located at 532 Ash Street, Ramona, CA 92065, and governed by a three-person Board of Trustees, who are appointed by the San Diego County Board of Supervisors.

State and federal representation

Geography
According to the United States Geological Survey Ramona is located at  within the Santa Maria Valley. This is near the intersection of State Route 67 and State Route 78 and near the economic center of Ramona.

Because Ramona is not an incorporated city, there are no city limits by which to measure its area. There are primarily three geographic areas by which the land area of Ramona is measured: 1. The boundaries of the Ramona Municipal Water District (approximately ); 2. The boundaries of the Ramona Unified School District (approximately ), and; 3. The boundaries of the Ramona Community Planning Area. The last is the primary area utilized by San Diego County's regional planning agency, the San Diego Association of Governments (SANDAG).

The RCPA includes the unincorporated town of Ramona, California, and is located in the foothills of the Laguna Mountains. It is located east northeast of the City of Poway (with which it shares a boundary), east southeast of the City of Escondido, north of Lakeside, California and west southwest of Santa Ysabel, California.

The RCPA consists primarily of the Santa Maria Valley and the San Vicente Valley, and the steep or mountainous terrain surrounding them. It also includes the Ballena Valley east of town, and Bandy Canyon and a small portion of the southern edge of the San Pasqual Valley. In the San Pasqual Valley, the RCPA abuts the City of San Diego.

The historical town center of Ramona is located in the Santa Maria Valley. This valley was the Rancho Santa Maria, a Mexican land grant. The San Vicente Valley was formerly part of the Rancho Cañada de San Vicente y Mesa del Padre Barona Mexican land grant. The San Diego Country Estates subdivision in Ramona is located in the San Vicente Valley. The Barona Indian Reservation, not part of the RCPA, is also within part of the Rancho Cañada de San Vicente y Mesa del Padre Barona Mexican land grant.

Map of the Ramona Community Planning Area.

Climate
Ramona has a Mediterranean climate (Köppen Csa) typical of inland southern California, with a high diurnal temperature variation that averages  over the year.

Demographics

2010

Ramona CDP
At the 2010 census Ramona had a population of 20,292. The racial makeup of Ramona was 15,887 (78.3%) White, 139 (0.7%) African American, 224 (1.1%) Native American, 279 (1.4%) Asian, 71 (0.3%) Pacific Islander, 2,965 (14.6%) from other races, and 727 (3.6%) from two or more races. Hispanic or Latino of any race were 6,334 persons (31.2%).

The census reported that 20,168 people (99.4% of the population) lived in households, 114 (0.6%) lived in non-institutionalized group quarters, and 10 (0%) were institutionalized.

There were 6,627 households, 2,631 (39.7%) had children under the age of 18 living in them, 3,893 (58.7%) were opposite-sex married couples living together, 788 (11.9%) had a female householder with no husband present, 425 (6.4%) had a male householder with no wife present.  There were 419 (6.3%) unmarried opposite-sex partnerships, and 62 (0.9%) same-sex married couples or partnerships. 1,091 households (16.5%) were one person and 429 (6.5%) had someone living alone who was 65 or older. The average household size was 3.04.  There were 5,106 families (77.0% of households); the average family size was 3.36.

The age distribution was 5,247 people (25.9%) under the age of 18, 2,140 people (10.5%) aged 18 to 24, 4,901 people (24.2%) aged 25 to 44, 5,945 people (29.3%) aged 45 to 64, and 2,059 people (10.1%) who were 65 or older.  The median age was 36.7 years. For every 100 females, there were 101.0 males.  For every 100 females age 18 and over, there were 99.4 males.

There were 7,083 housing units at an average density of 184.3 per square mile, of the occupied units 4,187 (63.2%) were owner-occupied and 2,440 (36.8%) were rented. The homeowner vacancy rate was 1.8%; the rental vacancy rate was 6.1%.  12,399 people (61.1% of the population) lived in owner-occupied housing units and 7,769 people (38.3%) lived in rental housing units.

Ramona, including San Diego Country Estates CDP
The 2010 United States Census reported that Ramona CDP and San Diego Country Estates CDP combined had a population of 30,301. The racial makeup of this combination was 24,994 (82.5%) White, 230 (0.8%) African American, 314 (1.0%) Native American, 426 (1.4%) Asian, 105 (0.3%) Pacific Islander, 3,041 (10.0%) from other races, and 1,091 (3.6%) from two or more races.  Hispanic or Latino of any race were 7,460 persons (24.6%).

2000
The United States census of 2000 included two census-designated places (CDP) - Ramona CDP and San Diego Country Estate CDP. Some areas of Ramona were not included in any CDP.

The U.S. Census Bureau created a new statistical entity for tabulating summary statistics from Census 2000 by ZIP code, the Zip Code Tabulation Area (ZCTA). Ramona has a single United States Postal Service ZIP code: 92065.

The San Diego Association of Governments (SANDAG), San Diego County's regional planning agency, has compiled census data for all census tracts in the Ramona Community Planning Area (RCPA). These statistics are slightly different than the 92065 ZCTA, as the RCPA includes some land area outside the 92065 ZIP code.   (Map of RCPA)

2000 census information for the Ramona CDP, the San Diego Country Estate CDP, 92065 ZCTA, and the RCPA (as prepared by SANDAG), is set forth below.

92065 ZCTA
At the 2000 census, there were 33,087 people living in the 92065 Zip Code Tabulation Area.

RCPA

At the 2000 census, there were 33,404 people, 10,803 households, and 8,814 families living in the RCPA. The population density was 254.5 inhabitants per square mile (158.3/km). The racial makeup of the RCPA was 78.35% White, 0.67% African American, 0.81% Native American, 0.97% Asian, 0.20% Pacific Islander, 0.16% from other races, and 1.82% from two or more races. Hispanic or Latino of any race were 17.03% of the population.

There were 10,803 households, 45.8% had children under the age of 18 living with them, 68.5% were married couples living together, 8.67% had a female householder with no husband present, and 18.41% were non-families. 13.2% of households were made up of individuals. The average household size was 3.09 and the average family size was 3.79.

In the RCPA the population was spread out, with 30.03% under the age of 18, 8.08% from 18 to 24, 29.01% from 25 to 44, 23.53% from 45 to 64, and 9.34% 65 or older. The median age was 35.7 years. For every 100 females, there were 101.6 males. For every 100 females age 18 and over, there were 90.3 males.

The median household income was in the RCPA was $60,534. The per capita income for the RCPA was $19,576. About 5.3% of families and 9% of the population were below the poverty line. Only 3.57% of families including a married couple were below the poverty line, while 13.98% of male-headed households with no wife present and 14.62% of female-headed households with no husband present fell below the poverty line.

Of the population 15 years of age or older, 63% were married (excluding separated), 23% had never been married, 8% were divorced, 4% were widowed, and 1% were separated. Of those 25 or older 86.34% had graduated high school (including GEDs), and 31.1% had attended college, but had not earned a degree. 8% of this group had earned an associate degree, 15% a bachelor's degree and 6% a masters. 2% had gone on to earn a professional school degree, and 1% had earned a doctorate.

72.2% of housing units were owner occupied, with the median value of these set at $240,137. Of all housing units in the RCPA, 82.71% were built in 1970 or later, and 55.1% were built in 1980 or later.

96.03% of occupied households had at least one motor vehicle, and 75.49% had two or more vehicles. For those employed, the average travel time to work was 36 minutes. 14.76% had travel times to work of 60 minutes or more.

Ramona CDP

According to the United States Census Bureau the Ramona CDP is located at Ramona is located at  (33.035868, -116.870633).

At the 2000 census there were 15,691 people, 5,021 households, and 3,886 families living in the CDP. The population density was 1,026.9 inhabitants per square mile (396.5/km). The racial makeup of the CDP was 80.60% White, 0.78% African American, 1.33% Native American, 0.78% Asian, 0.27% Pacific Islander, 12.56% from other races, and 3.68% from two or more races. Hispanic or Latino of any race were 24.99%.

Of the 5,021 households 43.6% had children under the age of 18 living with them, 60.1% were married couples living together, 11.6% had a female householder with no husband present, and 22.6% were non-families. 16.1% of households were one person and 6.5% were one person aged 65 or older. The average household size was 3.10 and the average family size was 3.45.

The age distribution was 31.2% under the age of 18, 10.3% from 18 to 24, 30.3% from 25 to 44, 20.1% from 45 to 64, and 8.2% 65 or older. The median age was 31 years. For every 100 females, there were 101.3 males. For every 100 females age 18 and over, there were 99.4 males.

The median household income was $48,625 and the median family income  was $53,372. Males had a median income of $40,376 versus $26,105 for females. The per capita income for the CDP was $18,898. About 9.1% of families and 12.8% of the population were below the poverty line, including 16.0% of those under age 18 and 7.1% of those age 65 or over.

San Diego Country Estates CDP

According to the United States Census Bureau the San Diego Country Estates CDP is located at  (33.002636, -116.799005).

At the 2000 census there were 9,262 people, 2,992 households, and 2,650 families living in the CDP. The population density was 545.9 inhabitants per square mile (210.7/km). The racial makeup of the CDP was 92.92% White, 0.72% African American, 0.49% Native American, 1.12% Asian, 0.27% Pacific Islander, 1.72% from other races, and 2.76% from two or more races. Hispanic or Latino of any race were 7.70%.

Of the 2,992 households 47.5% had children under the age of 18 living with them, 80.0% were married couples living together, 6.0% had a female householder with no husband present, and 11.4% were non-families. 8.4% of households were one person and 3.6% were one person aged 65 or older. The average household size was 3.10 and the average family size was 3.27.

The age distribution was 31.6% under the age of 18, 5.5% from 18 to 24, 29.5% from 25 to 44, 23.2% from 45 to 64, and 10.2% 65 or older. The median age was 38 years. For every 100 females, there were 98.3 males. For every 100 females age 18 and over, there were 96.4 males.

The median household income was $77,547 and the median family income  was $79,409. Males had a median income of $55,825 versus $34,472 for females. The per capita income for the CDP was $27,685. About 2.6% of families and 3.4% of the population were below the poverty line, including 3.3% of those under age 18 and 1.0% of those age 65 or over.

Agriculture
At one time Ramona was known as the "Turkey Capital of the World."  Turkey production flourished during the 1930s, and the industry was featured with popular annual Turkey Days celebrations. Turkey production went into sharp decline following World War II, and ended completely by 1959.

The decline of the turkey industry was followed by rapid growth in the chicken egg business. Egg production, which began in the 1920s, thrived into the 1970s. In 1970, there were about 50 egg ranches in Ramona. Today, most of the chicken ranches are gone. By 2003, only four remained. A notable exception to the decline is the Pine Hills Egg Ranch, which at 1,100,000 birds is the 58th largest nationally, and the 5th largest in the state of California.  The demise of the egg industry was, in part, due to population growth and increased land values. It was also caused by an outbreak of deadly exotic Newcastle's Disease in 1971, which took three years to stem, and another outbreak in late 2002.

Dairies used to be common in Ramona, particularly along contiguous Dye Road, Ramona Street and Warnock Road. Today, one dairy remains on Dye Road.

Notable among current agricultural pursuits in Ramona is rapidly growing wine grape production. The  Ramona Valley American Viticultural Area surrounds the town. An aerial photograph depicting the Ramona Valley Viticultural Area may be viewed at the Ramona Valley Vineyard Association's website.

Although the cost of imported water has been a negative issue in recent years, avocado and citrus orchards are also prominent.

Perhaps Ramona's greatest recent claim to fame comes from Thoroughbred horse breeding. The Golden Eagle Farm in eastern Ramona's Ballena Valley was the home of Best Pal, the second-place finisher of the 1991 Kentucky Derby. No California bred race horse has earned more than the US$5.6 million in purses he won. Best Pal is buried on the Golden Eagle Farm.

Notable residents

Budd Boetticher - film and television director, producer; died in Ramona
Johnny Borneman, III - American racecar driver
William Thomas Burns - Major League Baseball player; died in Ramona
William Cagney - film producer, brother of James Cagney, owned a ranch in Ramona
Dave Cripe - baseball player; born in Ramona
Jake Gagne – motorcycle racer; was born and grew up in Ramona
John Hopkins - motorcycle racer, MotoGP, Superbike World Championship
Ross Martin - actor, The Wild Wild West; died in Ramona
Archie Moore - boxer, light-heavyweight world champion 1952–62, actor; owned training camp in Ramona, where a street is named for him
Casey Tibbs - rodeo cowboy and actor; died in Ramona
Dai Vernon - magician; died in Ramona
Nick Vincent - Major League Baseball pitcher; attended Ramona High School
Lynda Wiesmeier - Playboy Playmate, Miss July 1982; died in Ramona

See also

Ramona Airport
Ramona High School (Ramona, CA)
Ramona Valley Viticultural Area
San Diego Association of Governments

References

 
Census-designated places in San Diego County, California
East County (San Diego County)
North County (San Diego County)
Populated places established in 1886
1886 establishments in California
Census-designated places in California